Abgaal (Somali: Abgaal, Arabic: أبغال) is a sub-clan of the Hawiye and the even larger Samaale clan. It is one of the major Somali clans and has produced many prominent historical Somali figures including 3 presidents, and the father of the Somali military.

Etymology
Italian scholar of Somali and Ethiopian studies Enrico Cerulli studies discusses the origin story of the name Abgaal in his book How a Hawiye tribe used to live.
<blockquote class="templatequote">
<p>The mother of Hirabä was Faduma Karanlä. The mother of Abgal was Faduma Sargellä, who was an Aguran. She was espoused by 'Isman Darandollä. By him she had a son, who was called by the name 'Ali 'Isman. Later one went to Sargellä Garën. A learned old man went to him. He said: 'O noble Sargellä, I saw in the books that the children of the boy born to your daughter Faduma will chase your children from the earth. I saw it in the books.' 'Did you see these things?’
'Yes, I saw them,’ he answered. 'So be it!’ the noble Sargellä replied; and into his heart came the thought: 'Rather than that your children, whom you have begotten, be killed, the son of your daughter might rather die!’ This came into his heart. After this he prepared two different amulets, one good and one bad. The bad one would kill the one who drank it. The good one would protect from any evil of this world. Then he went to his daughter. 'My Faduma, I am bringing you these two amulets: this one here – and it was the good one – you drink; and the other one – and it was the bad one – give to your son 'Ali 'Isman!’ The girl took the two amulets; but when it came to drinking them, she made a mistake! Faduma Sargellä drank the bad one and died immediately. 'Ali 'Ismän drank the good one and survived. Sargellä went back to the hut and saw his daughter dead. And the boy, when he heard his grandfather arrive, ran to the side of a saddle camel and hid behind it. 'Oh 'Ali, oh 'Ali! Come! I am your grandfather!’ Sargellä cried out, looking for the boy. 'You are not my grandfather ( abkäy  ), my grandfather is the camels.' The camels ( gel  ) in the language of one time were called gal. So afterwards he ('Ali 'Isman) had the name of Ab-gal ('Camel-grandfather').”
The tradition substantially recalls the ancient fights between the Abgal, nomadic pastoralists who from places farther north tried to open a way to the river, and the Aguran, who dominated the region of the Middle Webi. This historical content, of course, has been adapted in popular dress with the theme, so widespread in the folklore of quite different peoples, of the prediction of the unborn child destined to drive the reigning prince from the throne.
'In this tradition Abgal has, besides his Somali name, which is explained, also a Mussulman name, 'Ali 'Isman. It does not seem necessary to me to suppose that the name 'Ali replaced the Somali one of Abgal in the genealogies in order to make them more Islamized, as one might say. The custom of several names for one single person, among which names, for the Mussulmans, are found an Arab one and one (or more) in the local language, is common in East Africa, even now.</p>
—Enrico Cerulli, How a Hawiye Tribe use to Live
</blockquote>

Overview
The Abgaal are part of the Mudulood and the even larger Hiraab clan. The Hiraab consists of the Mudulood, Habar Gidir, Sheekhaal and Duduble. Besides the Abgaal, Mudulood includes Wacdaan, Moobleen, Hiilibi and Udeejeen. The Imam of both the Mudulood and Hiraab traditionally hails from the Abgaal. Currently Imam Mohamed Yusuf is the Imam of the Mudulood and also carries the dual position as Imam of the Hiraab.The Quranyo section of the Garre claim descent from Dirr, who are born of the Irrir Samal. UNDP Paper in Keyna http://www.undp.org/content/dam/kenya/docs/Amani%20Papers/AP_Volume1_n2_May2010.pdf 

Role and influence in Somalia

The Abgaal have historically played an important role in Somali affairs. They are the Somali sub-clan that has produced the most Somali Presidents. These three politicians are Ali Mahdi Muhammad, Sharif Sheikh Ahmed, and Hassan Sheikh Mohamoud. These officials constitute three of the four living former Presidents of Somalia. Additionally they are the first and only Somali sub-clan to have had consecutive presidencies in the terms of Sharif Sheikh Ahmed and Hassan Sheikh Mohamed. The father of the Somali military Daud Abdulle Hirsi was also Abgaal. Moreover, the clan has prominent members within the Somali business and media communities. For instance Abdirahman Yabarow, the editor-in-chief of VOA Somali hails from this clan.

Poetry
The Abgaal have their own form of Somali poetry. The guurow and shirib are unique poetical genres that are performed by the Abgaal and sometimes neighboring clans. Their poetry has distinctive dialect characteristics. For instance "iyo" with a long 'o' is a feature within their poetry. The most popular of Abgaal poetry is the shirib. The shirib are short songs that usually accompany dancing. They are sung during various gatherings such as family meetings, clan meetings, and celebrations.

Clan tree
Ali Jimale Ahmed outlines the Hawiye clan genealogical tree in The Invention of Somalia'':
 Samaale
 Irir
 Hawiye
 Gorgate
 Hiraab
 Mudulood
 Abgaal
 Harti
 Agoonyar
 Warsangeli
 Owbakar
Ciise Harti
 Wabudhan
Da'oud
Kabaale 
Galmaax                                                                                                       
Celi Cumar 
Reer Mataan
Mohamed Muse
Xuseen Yonis
 Waceysle
 Abdirahman Saleebaan
 Absuge Qombor
 Ali Gaaf
 Macalin Dhiblaawe 
 Dhagaweyne Cumar
 Haruun Waceysle

Prominent Abgaal members

Politics
 Sharif Sheikh Ahmed, Former President of Somalia 
 Hassan Sheikh Mohamud, Current President of Somalia
 Omar Finnish, former Mayor of Mogadishu and Governor of Banaadir
 Nur Hassan Husein, Former Prime Minister of the Transitional Federal Government
 Ali Ghedi, Former Prime Minister of the Transitional Federal Government
 Ali Mahdi Muhammad, President of Somalia from 1991– 1997 
 Hussein Kulmiye Afrah, vice-president of Somalia under the Siad Barre Regime
 Abdirahman Omar Osman, was the Governor of Banaadir and Mayor of Mogadishu.
 Ahmed Maxamed Xasan, Lieutenant Colonel in the Somali Airforce who defused the MiG-17 jet fighter bombs
 Salaad Gabeyre Kediye, Major General in the Somali Military, and chairman of the Somali Revolution
 Ismail Jim'ale Osoble, Somali lawyer and Minister of Information in the government of Aden Abdulle Osman
 General Daud Abdulle Hirsi, First Commander-In-Chief of the Somali National Army Forces 
 Salad Ali Jelle, Deputy Minister of Defense of the Transitional Federal Government
 Adde Gabow (Mohamed Ali Hassan), Politician, Governor and Mayor of Mogadishu
 Mohamed Ameriko, Somali Ambassador to Kenya 
 Abdulahi Afrah, Minister of Commerce
 Ali Dhere, Cleric and the Head of the first Islamic Court in northern Mogadishu

Others
 Hussein Sheikh Ahmed Kaddare, Orthographer and the Inventor of the Kaddariya Script
 Farah Weheliye Addow (Sindiko), Former Vice President of the Confederation of African Football
Abdi Mohamed Ulusso, PhD Holder, Intellectual and 2004 Somali Presidential Candidate 
Hilowle Omar, Chairman of the (Somali Reconciliation and Reconstruction Council) (SRRC)
 Ayub Daud, Professional Footballerdate=7 
 Omar Mohamed, Professional Footballer
 Abdirahman Yabarow, Editor-in-Chief of the VOA Somali Service

References

Hawiye clan